A. asiaticus may refer to:

 Acartauchenius asiaticus, a money spider species in the genus Acartauchenius
 Aduncothrips asiaticus, a thrip species in the family Aeolothripidae
 Aesalus asiaticus, a beetle species in the genus Aesalus; see 
 Alastor asiaticus, a wasp species in the genus Alastor
 Araneus asiaticus, an orb-weaver spider species
 Archaeornithomimus asiaticus, a dinosaur species
 Asiabadus asiaticus, a ground spider species in the genus Asiabadus

See also
 Asiaticus (disambiguation)